EUAM may mean :
 European Union Administration of Mostar,
 EU Advisory Mission, or EUAM Ukraine : European Union Advisory Mission for Civilian Security Sector Reform in Ukraine.